Nildo Parente (1934 – 31 January 2011) was a Brazilian film actor. He appeared in 60 films between 1962 and 2010. Parente died on 31 January 2011, in Rio de Janeiro, due to a stroke.

Selected filmography

 O 5º Poder (1962)
 O Homem Que Comprou o Mundo (1968)
 Tempo de Violência (1969)
 O Homem das Estrelas (1970)
 The Alienist (1970) - Father Simão Bacamarte
 Anjos e Demônios (1970)
 O Doce Esporte do Sexo (1971) - (segment "O Torneio")
 Mãos Vazias (1971)
 Jardim de Espumas (1971)
 S. Bernardo (1972) - Padilha
 Quem é Beta? (1973)
 Um Homem Célebre (1974)
 Onanias o Poderoso Machão (1974)
 Essas Mulheres Lindas, Nuas e Maravilhosas (1974)
 Os Condenados (1975)
 Ipanema, Adeus (1975)
 Nem Os Bruxos Escapam (1975)
 Padre Cícero (1976)
 Tenda dos Milagres (1977) - Prof. Nilo Argolo
 O Seminarista (1977)
 Ajuricaba, o Rebelde da Amazônia (1977)
 Se Segura, Malandro! (1978)
 Batalha dos Guararapes (1978) - General Von Schkoppe
 Pequenas Taras (1978)
 Colonel Delmiro Gouveia (1978)
 Terror e Êxtase (1979)
 O Princípio do Prazer (1979)
 O Coronel e o Lobisomem (1979)
 Eu Matei Lúcio Flávio (1979)
 Parceiros da Aventura (1980) - Diretor da gravadora
 Giselle (1982) - Luccini
 Cabaret Mineiro (1980)
 Fruto do Amor (1981)
 Luz del Fuego (1982) - Delgado
 Tensão no Rio (1982)
 Rio Babilônia (1982)
 Gabriela, Cravo e Canela (1983) - Maurício Caires
 Águia na Cabeça (1984)
 Memoirs of Prison (1984) - Emanuel
 Para Viver um Grande Amor (1984)
 Amor Maldito (1984)
 Kiss of the Spider Woman (1985) - Leader of Resistance
 Leila Diniz (1987)
 Moon over Parador (1988) - Gray Man
 Natal da Portela (1988)
 Xuxa e os Trapalhões em o Mistério de Robin Hood (1990)
 Kickboxer 3 (1992) - Vargas
 A Viagem (1994, TV Series) - Waldomiro (Alexandre's killer)
 Quatro por Quatro (1995, TV Series) - Juiz
 Malhação (1997, TV Series) - Severo
 Bela Donna (1998) - Padre Jorge
 Um Crime Nobre (2001)
 Que sera, sera (2002) - Delegado carioca
 Celebridade (2003-2004, TV Series) - Wanderley Mourão
 América (2005, TV Series) - Médico
 Brasília 18% (2006) - Gonçalves Dias
 Inesquecível (2007) - Padre
 Cleopatra (2007) - Roman Senator
 Meu Nome é Dindi (2007) - Palhaço Alegria
 Paraíso Tropical (2007, TV Series) - Pacífico
 Chico Xavier (2010) - Juiz (final film role)

References

External links

1934 births
2011 deaths
Brazilian male film actors